Bank Gaborone, formally Bank Gaborone Limited, is a commercial bank in Botswana.

, the bank had 5 branches and over 30 automated teller machines around the country.

History
The Bank of Botswana issued a license to Bank Gaborone Limited to commence with its full retail banking business on February 1, 2006. Bank Gaborone opened their first branch on Pilane Road, Gaborone during September 2006. Since 2022 the bank boasts of 11 branches in the city's main mall, Gamecity Mall, Central business District (Gaborone), Molepolole, Kang, Ghanzi, Maun, Kasane, Francistown, Palapaye and Mahalapye.

Ownership
Bank Gaborone is a 100% subsidiary of Capricorn Investment Holdings (Botswana) Limited (CIHB). In turn, CIHB is 94.9% owned by Capricorn Investment Holdings (CIH).

Group Structure
Capricorn Investment Holdings owns other financial institutions in whole or in part, including the following:

  Botswana
 Capricorn Investment Holdings (Botswana) Limited - 94.9% Shareholding
 Bank Gaborone Limited - 94.9% Shareholding
 Ellwood Insurance Brokers limited - 94.9% Shareholding
 SmartSwitch Botswana Limited - 47.5% Shareholding
 Capricorn Asset Management Limited - 75.2% Shareholding
 Capricorn Capital Limited - 100% Shareholding
 Cyan ES Limited - 100% Shareholding

  Namibia
 Bank Windhoek Holdings Limited - 73% Shareholding
 Bank Windhoek - 73% Shareholding
 BW finance Limited - 73% Shareholding
 Welwitschia Nammic Insurance Brokers Limited - 56.7% Shareholding
 Namib Bou Limited - 73% Shareholding
 Santam Namibia Limited - 18.3%Shareholding
 Sanlam Namibia Holdings Limited - 21.5% Shareholding
 Nammic Financial Services Holdings - 100% Shareholding
 GH Group Employee Share Trust - 16.4% Shareholding

  Zambia
 Cavmont Capital Holdings Zambia Plc. - 44.5% Shareholding
 Cavmont Capital Bank - 44.5% Shareholding

Branches
, the bank maintains branches at the following locations:

 Main Branch - Main Mall, Gaborone
 Game City Mall Branch - Gaborone
 Molepolole Branch - Mafenyatlala Mall, Molepolole
 Francistown Branch - Galo Mall, Francistown
 Ghanzi Branch - Ghanzi
 CBD Branch, Gaborone
 Rail park Shopping Mall, Gaborone
 Game city mall, Gaborone
 Airport Junction Mall Gaborone

See also
 List of banks in Botswana
 List of banks in Namibia
 List of banks in Zambia

References

Banks of Gaborone
Banks established in 2006